Adam C. Wagner (1858 or 1860 – 1935) was an architect and engineer based in Philadelphia who designed breweries as well as residences. His work includes the American Brewing Company Plant in Rhode Island. He also designed Esslinger brewery building and Stegmaier Federal Building in Wilkes-Barre, formerly Stegmaier Brewery.

Wagner was an immigrant from Germany and served many German clients.

He designed a brewery in Waterbury, Connecticut for Theresa Weibel.

Work
Cataract Brewing Company at 13 Cataract Street in Rochester, New York
Weisbrod & Hess brewery (1891) on Martha Street in Kensington, Philadelphia
Kensington Labor Lyceum
Stegmaier Brewery now Stegmaier Federal Building in Wilkes-Barre, listed on the National Register of Historic Places (NRHP)
American Brewing Company Plant in Providence, Rhode Island, listed on the NRHP
Esslinger's brewery, Philadelphia

References

Year of birth missing (living people)
1935 deaths